Kandy (Mahanuwara) electoral district is one of the 22 multi-member electoral districts of Sri Lanka created by the 1978 Constitution of Sri Lanka. The district is conterminous with the administrative district of Kandy in the Central province. The district currently elects 12 of the 225 members of the Sri Lankan Parliament and had 970,456 registered electors in 2010.

1982 presidential election
Results of the 1st presidential election held on 20 October 1982 for the district:

1988 presidential election
Results of the 2nd presidential election held on 19 December 1988 for the district:

1989 parliamentary general election
Results of the 9th parliamentary election held on 15 February 1989 for the district:

The following candidates were elected:
Dingiri Banda Wijetunga (UNP), 58,617 preference votes (pv); D. M. Jayaratne (SLFP), 54,290 pv; Mahahitana Arachchige Daniel (UNP), 53,396 pv; Abdul Cader Shahul Hameed (UNP), 36,375 pv; A.R.M. Abdul Cader (UNP), 33,757 pv; Hettihewage Chandraman de Silva (UNP), 29,726 pv; Tikiribanda Harindranatha Dunuwila (UNP), 28,377 pv; Tissa Attanayake (UNP), 27,788 pv; Rankeththege Premachandra Wijesiri (UNP), 27,555 pv; Abeykoon Mudiyanselage Mahinda Abeykoon (SLFP), 26,881 pv; Yasaratne Tennakoon (SLFP), 22,736 pv; and Lakshman Kiriella (SLFP), 20,898 pv.

Mahahitana Arachchige Daniel (UNP) was murdered on 25 June 1989.

1993 provincial council election
Results of the 2nd Central provincial council election held on 17 May 1993 for the district:

1994 parliamentary general election
Results of the 10th parliamentary election held on 16 August 1994 for the district:

The following candidates were elected:
Gamini Dissanayake (UNP), 198,207 preference votes (pv); D. M. Jayaratne (PA), 101,558 pv; Anuruddha Ratwatte (PA), 92,644 pv; Herath Mudiyanselage Lucky Dissanayake Jayawardene (UNP), 66,340 pv; A.R.M. Abdul Cader (UNP), 66,136 pv; Kuruppu Arachchilage Wilson Kuruppu Arachchi (PA), 63,969 pv; Abdul Cader Shahul Hameed (UNP), 61,906 pv; Tissa Attanayake (UNP), 60,531 pv; Lakshman Kiriella (PA), 59,463 pv; Sarath Amunugama (UNP), 53,997 pv; Ediriweera Weerawardhana (PA), 53,192 pv; and Irajarathnan Sivasamy (UNP), 38,343 pv

Gamini Dissanayake (UNP) was murdered on 24 October 1994.

1994 presidential election
Results of the 3rd presidential election held on 9 November 1994 for the district:

1999 provincial council election
Results of the 3rd Central provincial council election held on 6 April 1999 for the district:

1999 presidential election
Results of the 4th presidential election held on 21 December 1999 for the district:

2000 parliamentary general election
Results of the 11th parliamentary election held on 10 October 2000 for the district:

The following candidates were elected:
Keheliya Rambukwella (UNP), 154,403 preference votes (pv); Anuruddha Ratwatte (PA), 152,511 pv; D. M. Jayaratne (PA), 85,711 pv; Tissa Attanayake (UNP), 73,111 pv; Mahindananda Aluthgamage (PA), 71,653 pv; Sarath Amunugama (PA-UNP(A)), 67,731 pv; A.R.M. Abdul Cader (UNP), 58,375 pv; Lakshman Kiriella (PA), 57,424 pv; M. H. A. Haleem (UNP), 45,177 pv; Heratha Mudiyanselage Lucky Dissanayake Jayawardhana (UNP), 42,085 pv; Ediriweera Weerawrdena (PA), 35,388 pv; and Rauff Hakeem (NUA-SLMC), 28,033 pv.

2001 parliamentary general election
Results of the 12th parliamentary election held on 5 December 2001 for the district::

The following candidates were elected:
Keheliya Rambukwella (UNF), 143,235 preference votes (pv); Anuruddha Ratwatte (PA), 102,906 pv; Tissa Attanayake (UNF), 99,381 pv; Sarath Amunugama (PA), 78,110 pv; M. H. A. Haleem (UNF), 75,630 pv; Rauff Hakeem (UNF-SLMC), 71,094 pv; Lakshman Kiriella (UNF), 70,241 pv; Abeyrathne Chitra Srimathi Manthilake (UNF) 51,768 pv; Thilina Bandara Tennakoon (PA), 51,542 pv; Mahindananda Aluthgamage (PA), 50,618 pv; Heratha Mudiyanselage Lucky Dissanayake Jayawardhana (UNF), 45,693 pv; and Dimuthu Bandara Abayakoon (JVP), 5,957 pv.

2004 parliamentary general election
Results of the 13th parliamentary election held on 2 April 2004 for the district:

The following candidates were elected:
Dimuthu Bandara Abayakoon (UPFA-JVP), 111,923 preference votes (pv); Keheliya Rambukwella (UNF-UNP), 110,720 pv; Tissa Attanayake (UNF-UNP), 93,971 pv; A.R.M. Abdul Cader (UNF-UNP), 89,829 pv; Mahindananda Aluthgamage (UPFA-SLFP), 82,036 pv; Lakshman Kiriella (UNF-UNP), 81,136 pv; Y.M. Nawaratna Banda (UPFA-JVP), 81,036 pv; Sarath Amunugama (UPFA-SLFP), 78,817 pv; M. H. A. Haleem (UNF-UNP), 66,669 pv; D. M. Jayaratne (UPFA-SLFP), 64,317 pv; Faiszer Musthapha (UNF-CWC), 40,475 pv; and Udawatte Nanda (JHU), 10,846 pv.

2004 provincial council election
Results of the 4th Central provincial council election held on 10 July 2004 for the district:

The following candidates were elected:
D.S.B. Amunugama (UPFA), 48,941 preference votes (pv); Amaranath Samansiri Fernando (UPFA), 39,476 pv; Sarath Ekanayake (UPFA), 36,387 pv; H.M. Lucky Dissanayake (UNP), 31,071 pv; Mohamad Rafeek Mohamad Hamjad (UNP), 28,447 pv; Aluthgamage Ananada Aluthgamage (UPFA), 28,034 pv; Abeykoon Mudiyanselage Mahinda Abeykoon (UPFA), 27,643 pv; Ediriweera Weerawardhena (UPFA), 27,047 pv; Aththiadi Gedera Mohamed Saheed (UNP), 24,991 pv; R.G. Samaranayake (UPFA), 24,181 pv; Doreiswami Madiyagurajah (UNP), 23,519 pv; A. Chithra Srimathi Manthilaka (UNP), 23,247 pv; R. Senaratne Mahinda Wijesiri (UNP), 23,097 pv; M.G. Jayaratne (UPFA), 21,577 pv; Abeykoon Mudiyanselage Manel Bandara Abeyratne (UPFA), 21,067 pv; Nishshanka Herath (UPFA), 20,658 pv; Arambegedara Sunil Wickramasinghe (UPFA), 20,613 pv; Nihal Gunasekara (UNP), 20,454 pv; A.G. Sirisena (UPFA), 19,651 pv; Aliapperuma Don Hareendra Chanaka (UNP), 18,185 pv; Amaratunga Sunil Kithsiri (UPFA), 18,116 pv; H.A. Ranasinghe (UPFA), 17,428 pv; M. Punchi Banda Dasanayake (UPFA), 17,392 pv; Chandana Dissanayake (UPFA), 17,099 pv; Kongahage Wickramasinghe Srima Shanthini (UNP), 16,973 pv; Irajarathnam Sivasamy (UNP), 14,267 pv; Alwis Samaraweera Mudalige Padmalal de (UNP), 14,071 pv; A. Seiyadu Mohammadu Mohammadu Marjan Alhaj (UNP), 13,719 pv; Mahahithana Arachchige Rupa Sriyani Daniel (UNP), 13,203 pv; and Alim Masihudeen Naimullah Alhaj (UNP), 13,147 pv.

2005 presidential election
Results of the 5th presidential election held on 17 November 2005 for the district:

2009 provincial council election
Results of the 5th Central provincial council election held on 14 February 2009 for the district:

The following candidates were elected:
S.B. Dissanayake (UNP), 181,783 preference votes (pv); Sarath Ekanayake (UPFA), 99,932 pv; D.S.B. Amunugama (UPFA), 77,179 pv; Lohan Ratwatte (UPFA), 70,372 pv; Ediriweera Weerawardhena (UPFA), 46,903 pv; Ananada Aluthgamage (UPFA), 45,178 pv; Thilina Bandara Thennakoon (UPFA), 30,476 pv; Abeykoon Mudiyanselage Mahinda Abeykoon (UPFA), 30,170 pv; S.M.R.B. Samarakoon (UPFA), 29,686 pv; Kuruppu Arachchilage Wilson Kuruppuarachchi (UPFA), 29,637 pv; R.G. Samaranayake (UPFA), 28,479 pv; Mohamad Rafeek Mohamad Hamjad (UNP), 27,421 pv; A.G. Sirisena (UPFA), 26,676 pv; Jamaldeen Jeilabdeen (UNP), 26,103 pv; Gunathilaka Rajapaksha (UPFA), 25,957 pv; Amaratunga Sunil Kithsiri (UPFA), 25,787 pv; Jayawardhana Gammana Vithanalage (UPFA), 23,963 pv; Nishshanka Herath (UPFA), 23,477 pv; T.R. Linton Wijesinghe (UPFA), 22,879 pv; Aliapperuma Don Hareendra Chanaka (UNP), 22,447 pv; M.G. Jayaratne (UPFA), 21,301 pv; H.M. Lucky Dissanayake (UNP), 21,028 pv; H.A. Ranasinghe (UPFA), 21,011 pv; A. Sivasami Rajarathnam (UNP), 20,228 pv; Arawwawela Kadurugaskotuwe Muhammad Marjan (UNP), 19,520 pv; Kongahage Wickramasinghe Srima Shanthini (UNP), 18,472 pv; A.A.G.M.S.M. Shapi (UNP), 18,367 pv; Nihal Gunasekara (UNP), 18,115 pv; and R.P. Luxman Wijesiri (UNP), 16,749 pv.

2010 presidential election
Results of the 6th presidential election held on 26 January 2010 for the district:

2010 parliamentary general election
Results of the 14th parliamentary election held on 8 April 2010 for the district (excluding Nawalapitiya polling division):

The following candidates were elected:
Mahindananda Aluthgamage (UPFA-SLFP), 146,765 preference votes (pv); Keheliya Rambukwella (UPFA), 133,060 pv; S. B. Dissanayake (UPFA), 108,169 pv; Lohan Ratwatte (UPFA), 81,812 pv; A.R.M. Abdul Cader (UNF-UNP), 54,937 pv; Erik Weerawardena (UPFA), 54,195 pv; Rauff Hakeem (UNF-SLMC), 54,047 pv; Lakshman Kiriella (UNF-UNP), 53,690 pv; M. H. A. Haleem (UNF-UNP), 46,240 pv; Dilum Amunugama (UPFA), 45,909 pv; Faiszer Musthapha (UPFA), 44,648 pv; and Sarath Amunugama (UPFA-SLFP), 44,478 pv.

2013 provincial council election 
Results of the 6th provincial council election held on 21 September 2013 for the district:

The following candidates were elected: Anuradha Jayaratne (UPFA-SLFP), 107,644 preference votes (pv); Sarath Ekanayake (UPFA-SLFP), 70,171 pv; Asad Sali (UNP), 55,395 pv; J.M.A.M Lafeer (UNP), 45,792 pv; Thilina Bandara Tennakoon (UPFA-SLFP), 45,027 pv; Ediriweera Weerawardene (UPFA-SLFP), 44,206 pv; Mahinda Abeykoon (UPFA-SLFP), 29,889 pv; R.G Samaranayake (UPFA-SLFP), 28,646 pv; Mayantha Dissanayake (UNP), 27,204 pv; Nissanka Herath (UPFA-SLFP), 25,877 pv; Gunathilaka Rajapakse (UPFA-SLFP), 24,560 pv; Lucky Jayawardena (UNP), 24,437 pv; A.G Sirisena (UPFA-SLFP), 24,429 pv; Linton Wijesinghe (UPFA-SLFP), 24,266 pv; Sunil Amaratunga (UPFA-SLFP), 23,946 pv; Aluthgamage Weerasinghe (UPFA-SLFP), 23,652 pv; A.A.M Manel Bandara (UPFA-SLFP), 23,400 pv; M.G Jayaratne (UPFA-SLFP), 22,816 pv; Jagath Wijenayake (UPFA-SLFP), 22,386 pv; Gamini Wijebandara (UPFA-SLFP), 21,639 pv; Pathmalal De Alwis (UNP), 19,037 pv; Chanaka Ailapperuma (UNP), 18,603 pv; M. Welukumar (UNP), 18,159 pv; P.B Warawewa (UNP), 16,990 pv; Chithra Manthilake (UNP), 16,054 pv; A.T Madhiyugarajah (CWC), 8,774 pv; Channa Galappaththige (DP), 7,628 pv; Asanga Thilakaratne (DP), 5,542 pv; A.L.M Uvais (SLMC), 3,275 pv.

2015 presidential election 
Results of the 7th presidential election held on 26 January 2010 for the district:

References

Electoral districts of Sri Lanka
Politics of Kandy District